Rossburg is an unincorporated community in Warren County, in the U.S. state of Ohio.

History
Rossburg was not officially platted. The community was named for Enoch A. Ross, the proprietor of a local tannery. A post office was established in the early 1830s as "Rossburg", and the name of the post office was changed in 1838 to "Butlerville".

References

Unincorporated communities in Warren County, Ohio
Unincorporated communities in Ohio